Carreira is a former civil parish in the municipality of Santo Tirso, Portugal. In 2013, the parish merged into the new parish Carreira e Refojos de Riba de Ave. It is mostly residential, with some inhabitants working in agriculture.

Sport 
A.D.R. Santiaguense.

References

Former parishes of Santo Tirso